Summerfield is an unincorporated community in northwestern Castro County, Texas, United States.  It lies along U.S. Route 60 northwest of the city of Dimmitt, the county seat of Castro County.  Its elevation is 3,937 feet (1,200 m).  Although Summerfield is unincorporated, it has a post office, with the ZIP code of 79085.

Summerfield was founded as Boom in the late 1890s; it was renamed for surveyor John Summerfield in 1907 because there was another Texas community named Boom.  The community was built along the Pecos & Northern Texas Railway, near Castro Creek and the Deaf Smith and Parmer county lines.

As of 2020, it has a population of less than 100.

Climate
According to the Köppen Climate Classification system, Summerfield has a semi-arid climate, abbreviated "BSk" on climate maps.

References

External links
Profile of Summerfield from the Handbook of Texas Online

Unincorporated communities in Castro County, Texas
Unincorporated communities in Texas